Belembaoghin, also spelt Belembaghin, Belmbaghin or Bélembaoguen, is a commune in the Gounghin Department of Kouritenga Province in the Centre-Est region of Burkina Faso. It had a population of 522 in 2006.

According to a map by the European Commission's "Intelligent Energy - Europe" programme, Belembaoghin is located in the same place as Belemboulghin, and both are likely suburbs of the capital of the department, Gounghin.

Demographics

Neighbourhoods

References 

Populated places in the Centre-Est Region